The Odisha women's cricket team is an Indian domestic cricket team representing the Indian state of Odisha. The team has represented the state in Women's Senior One Day Trophy (List A) and  Senior women's T20 league.

Current squad

Current Odisha squad. Players with international caps are listed in bold.

Former players
Kadambini Mohakud
Swagatika Rath
Madhusmita Behera

Honours
 Women's Senior One Day Trophy:
 Runners-up (1): 2014–15

References 

Women's cricket teams in India
Cricket in Odisha